The Texas Chainsaw Massacre is a video game for the Atari 2600 based on the slasher film of the same name written by Tobe Hooper and Kim Henkel. The game released in March 1983 Wizard Video Games. The game was designed and programmed by VSS, a software development company started by Ed Salvo and several other ex-Games by Apollo programmers.

Gameplay
The player takes on the role of the movie's chainsaw-wielding villain, Leatherface, and attempts to murder trespassers while avoiding obstacles such as fences, wheelchairs, and cow skulls. The player controls the murderer with the objective to chase and kill victims. Each victim slain gives the player 1,000 points. The player receives additional fuel at every 5,000 points (5 victims). A life is lost when the player's chainsaw runs out of gasoline. Gameplay ends when the last tank of gas is consumed.

Reception
As one of the first horror-themed video games, The Texas Chainsaw Massacre caused controversy when it was released because of the violent nature of the video game and sold poorly; many stores refused to carry it. Wizard's other commercial release, Halloween, was also not well-received.

Reviews
 Electronic Fun with Computers & Games - October 1983

See also
 List of controversial video games

References

External links
The  Texas Chainsaw Massacre at Atari Mania
The Texas Chainsaw Massacre at GameFAQs

1980s horror video games
1983 video games
Action video games
Atari 2600 games
Atari 2600-only games
North America-exclusive video games
Obscenity controversies in video games
Single-player video games
The Texas Chainsaw Massacre (franchise) mass media
Video games based on films
Video games developed in the United States